The 2014–15 Úrvalsdeild kvenna was the 57th season of the Úrvalsdeild kvenna, the top tier women's basketball league on Iceland. The season started on October 8, 2014 and ended on April 27, 2015. Snæfell won its second straight title by defeating Keflavík 3–0 in the Finals.

Competition format
The participating teams first played a conventional round-robin schedule with every team playing each opponent twice "home" and twice "away" for a total of 28 games. The top four teams qualified for the championship playoffs whilst the bottom team was relegated to Division 1.

Regular season

Playoffs

References

External links
Official Icelandic Basketball Federation website
2014-2015 Úrvalsdeild statistics

Icelandic
Lea
Úrvalsdeild kvenna seasons (basketball)